R3 was a 50-minute British television drama series produced by the BBC between 1964 and 1965. Its full title was Ministry of Research Centre No. 3. The series starred John Robinson as Sir Michael Gerrard, Jeremy Young as Wilson, David Blake Kelly as Captain Rogers, and was set in a scientific research facility at the Ministry of Research. R3 is also notable for providing early TV exposure for a young Oliver Reed, cast as one of the scientists on the ministry staff, Dr. Richard Franklin.

In "Experiment in Death" (shown Tuesday 27 July 1965 on BBC1), written by N J Crisp, undersea exploration becomes an experiment in survival in a bathysphere. That show starred Edward Judd as Peters, Brigit Forsyth as a secretary, Donald Hoath as Turner and Stephen John as a meteorologist. It was produced by John Robins and directed by Paul Bernard.

No episodes of this series are thought to have survived the BBC's purging of the archives between the 1960s and 70s. However, a trailer from one edition was supposedly recovered from a tape in 2004, but has not been shown publicly.

Cast
Sir Michael Gerrard – John Robinson
Miss Brooks – Brenda Saunders
Philip Boult – Michael Hawkins
Tom Collis – Derek Benfield
Dr Richard Franklin – Oliver Reed
Dr George Fratton – Moultrie Kelsall
Dr Mary Howard – Elizabeth Sellars
Betty Mason – Janet Kelly
Pomeroy – Edwin Richfield
Porter – Maxwell Foster
Dr Jack Morton – Simon Lack
Dr Peter Travers – Richard Wordsworth

References

External links

BBC television dramas
1960s British drama television series
1964 British television series debuts
1965 British television series endings
Black-and-white British television shows